Gregory Robert Jennett (born 15 August 1968) is an Australian television presenter and journalist.

Jennett is currently a political correspondent on ABC News.

Career
Jennett completed his high school education at Newington College in 1986. He has been a journalist since 1995 and reports politics for the Australian Broadcasting Corporation. He started in radio and then moved to television news.

He was previously host of the Capital Hill program on ABC News.

In 2022, Jennett was appointed host of Afternoon Briefing on ABC News replacing Patricia Karvelas.

References

1968 births
Living people
People educated at Newington College
ABC News (Australia) presenters
Australian television journalists
ABC radio (Australia) journalists and presenters